In some versions of Greek mythology, Ophion ("serpent"; gen.: Ὀφίωνος), also called Ophioneus ruled the world with Eurynome before the two of them were cast down by Cronus and Rhea.

Mythology
Pherecydes of Syros's Heptamychia is the first attested mention of Ophion.

The story was apparently popular in Orphic poetry, of which only fragments survive.

Apollonius of Rhodes in his Argonautica (1.495f) summarizes a song of Orpheus:

He sang how the earth, the heaven and the sea, once mingled together in one form, after deadly strife were separated each from the other; and how the stars and the moon and the paths of the sun ever keep their fixed place in the sky; and how the mountains rose, and how the resounding rivers with their nymphs came into being and all creeping things. And he sang how first of all Ophion and Eurynome, daughter of Oceanus, held the sway of snowy Olympus, and how through strength of arm one yielded his prerogative to Cronos and the other to Rhea, and how they fell into the waves of Oceanus; but the other two meanwhile ruled over the blessed Titan-gods, while Zeus, still a child and with the thoughts of a child, dwelt in the Dictaean cave; and the earthborn Cyclopes had not yet armed him with the bolt, with thunder and lightning; for these things give renown to Zeus.

Lycophron (1191) relates that Zeus' mother, Rhea, is skilled in wrestling, having cast the former queen Eurynome into Tartarus.

Nonnus in his Dionysiaca has Hera say (8.158f):

I will go to the uttermost bounds of Oceanus and share the hearth of primeval Tethys; thence I will pass to the house of Harmonia and abide with Ophion.

Harmonia here is probably an error in the text for Eurynome. Ophion is mentioned again by Nonnus (12.43):

Beside the oracular wall she saw the first tablet, old as the infinite past, containing all the things in one: upon it was all that Ophion lord paramount had done, all that ancient Cronus accomplished.

We also have fragments of the writings of the early philosopher Pherecydes of Syros (6th century B.C.E.), who devised a myth or legend in which powers known as Zas and Chronos ("Time") and Chthonie ("Of the Earth") existed from the beginning and in which Chronos creates the universe. Some fragments of this work mention a birth of Ophioneus and a battle of the gods between Cronus (not Chronos) on one side and Ophioneus and his children on the other in which an agreement is made that whoever pushes the other side into Ogenos will lose, and the winner will hold heaven.

Eusebius of Caesarea in his Praeparatio Evangelica (1.10) cites Philo of Byblos as declaring that Pherecydes took Ophion and the Ophionidae from the Phoenicians.

Interpretations
Robert Graves (1955) imaginatively reconstructs a Pelasgian creation myth in his book The Greek Myths, involving a serpent "Ophion":
Ophion is created by "Eurynome", a supreme creatrix goddess dancing on the ocean's waves. Ophion fertilizes her, and she takes the form of a dove to lay an egg on the waters. Ophion entwines about Eurynome's egg until the world hatches from it. Ophion and Eurynome then reign from Mount Olympus, until Ophion boasts that he alone made the world. Eurynome kicks out his teeth as punishment, and banishes him to the underworld. Pelasgus, who taught humans all arts and crafts, sprang from Ophion's lost teeth.

Graves' re-interpretation is very similar to some Gnostic traditions, with the demiurge (often represented as a serpentine "Yaldabaoth") claiming to have created the world alone, despite the assistance of others. That assistance often is from "Sophia", who is represented as (or allied with) the Holy Spirit, hence her symbolism includes doves.

See also 
 Ophites

Notes

References 
 Martin Litchfield West, "Three Presocratic Cosmologies." In: The Classical Quarterly. 13(2), 1963, pp. 161–163.

Greek gods
Kings in Greek mythology
Snake gods